Zebra Three is a radio call sign, given by the fictional "Bay City, California" police department of the iconic 1970s television series Starsky & Hutch to Robbery-Homicide Division detectives David Starsky and Kenneth "Hutch" Hutchinson; the BCPD was loosely based upon the Los Angeles Police Department (LAPD) . The "Zebra" part of their call sign refers to them being a geographic patrol unit assigned to a special detail; however, the LAPD normally does this with uniformed officers.  Several Los Angeles locations were used for "Bay City", and uniformed police officers were seen wearing "BCPD" shoulder patches. Fans of the show applied the code name as a nickname for the Ford Gran Torino that Starsky owned; the general public picked up on it, and the car has been known since (incorrectly) as "Zebra Three", or more correctly the "Striped Tomato".

Original 'Perfect Car' 
Originally, the show's creator, William Blinn, was to have Starsky drive a green and white high performance Chevrolet Camaro because he remembered one that he had previously owned.

When the production was being planned, the studio was unable to locate another green and white Chevrolet Camaro or order a 1975 Camaro from General Motors, because of their lease contract with the Ford Motor Company.

'Perfect Car' 
When production started on the pilot, Ford Motor Company's studio-TV car loan program was the lease supplier for Spelling-Goldberg Productions that year. Producers looked at lease stock and chose two (one main, one backup) 351 Windsor V8-powered "Bright Red" (code 2B) 2-door Gran Torinos to portray Starsky's automobile.

The cars were equipped with chrome exterior rearview mirrors and protective black vinyl bodyside moldings, and the interiors were black with vinyl bench seats. On top of the factory paint the distinctive white "vector" stripe with bordering black pinstripe was applied. The Torinos had their rear ends lifted by air shocks and were equipped with "U.S." brand 5-slot aluminum wheels with larger rear tires plus a chrome tip on the exhaust pipe.

They also replaced the original 2.75 to 1 rear axle gearing (standard, along with automatic transmission, on 1975 and newer Torinos) with numerically higher gears for better acceleration during stunt driving scenes; this was done during all four seasons to the S-G Torinos. Engine sounds were dubbed into the show soundtrack since the Torinos were mechanically stock; emissions laws forbade modifying the engines or emissions systems of new cars.

When the pilot was successful, Spelling-Goldberg ordered two new 1975 Torinos for the first season. These cars were powered by 400 Modified V8s because extra power was going to be needed for additional stunt driving scenes; from the second to fourth seasons, three 1976 Torinos powered by 460 Lima V8s were used. Due to the success of the series, Ford produced 1,000 "limited edition" replicas of the Starsky and Hutch Torino from March to May 1976 at the Chicago assembly plant. Spelling-Goldberg leased one for a backup vehicle; it was known as "Unit 129". During the series' run, several 1974 to 1976 Gran Torinos were used as stunt cars to minimize damage, wear and tear on the main vehicles.

While Spelling-Goldberg was happy with the Torinos, the stars (specifically Paul Michael Glaser, who played Dave Starsky) were not so pleased. In fact, when Aaron Spelling showed Glaser his character's car, which Spelling had dubbed as the "surprise" that he had outside, Glaser's reaction was more of disgust rather than pleasure. His initial reply was "it's red."  

When interviewed about the Torino, which became the de facto "third star", Glaser had no qualms about saying he did not like the car at all. He was quoted as saying "it was huge, it had no pickup, it couldn't handle," and in all of the scenes where he would lock the brakes to stop at a crime scene and bump the car off the curb, Glaser was purposely trying to break the Torino.

Lea Dilallo, a main character in the TV series The Good Doctor, owns a pristine example which has featured prominently in several episodes.

External links 

 Starsky Torino

Fictional cars
Ford vehicles
Starsky & Hutch
f